Grammetaria is a genus of brachiopods belonging to the family Frieleiidae.

The species of this genus are found in Malesia and New Zealand.

Species:

Grammetaria africana 
Grammetaria bartschi 
Grammetaria minima

References

Brachiopod genera